Draken Harald Hårfagre is a large Viking longship built in the municipality of Haugesund, Norway. It is a ship that combines ocean-crossing sailing capabilities with a medieval warship's use of oars.

Construction
Building began in March 2010. Construction was funded by Sigurd Aase, described as a "Norwegian oil and gas tycoon."

An oceangoing Norwegian warship
The longship is a "25-sesse" (25 pairs of oars); in other words, it is equipped with 50 oars. Each oar is powered by two men. Under sail it requires a crew of 30 people.

The longship is constructed in oak and carries  of sail.

Draken Harald Hårfagre is the largest Viking ship built in modern times. In the Viking age, an attack carried out from the ocean would be in the form of a "strandhögg", i.e., highly mobile hit-and-run tactics. By the High Middle Ages the ships changed shape to become larger and heavier with platforms toward the bow and stern. This was done for the sake of sea battles, making it possible to board ships that lay alongside each other. In the 13th century, this tactic was well known and widely used in Scandinavia. The law of the land in those days included standards that required Norwegian provinces (fylker) to cooperate in supplying 116 such warships of 50 oars size (i.e., 25 pairs of oars) for duty in the Norwegian fleet of warships.

Norwegian boatbuilding traditions
Copies of Viking ships are usually based on interpretations of archaeological material, but in the construction of Draken Harald Hårfagre an alternative method was used. It was decided to begin with the living tradition of Norwegian boatbuilding, with roots that can be traced directly to the Viking Age. The foremost Norwegian traditional boat builders are involved in the project. Their knowledge of traditional boatbuilding is supplemented with the results of investigations carried out on archaeological material, source material in Old Norse literature, literature from the same period from foreign sources, iconographic material, etc. The goal of the project is to recreate in this manner an oceangoing warship of 50 oars taken right out of the Norse sagas.

Launch and maiden voyage
The launching of the longship took place in the summer of 2012. The initial period was one of exploring how to sail and row the ship, and for experimentation with the rigging along the coast of Norway.

In summer 2014, skippered by Swedish captain Björn Ahlander, the longship made its first real expedition, a three-week passage under sail from Norway to Merseyside, England. There it was hosted by the Liverpool Victoria Rowing Club. It also visited various other locations around the coast of the British Isles, including the Isle of Man, Western Isles, Orkney and Shetland.

Expedition America 2016

The ship left its home port of Haugesund, Norway on the 26th of April, 2016, bound for Newfoundland, the aim being to explore and retrace the first transatlantic crossing and the Viking discovery of the New World. The route included stops at the Shetland and Faroe Islands, Iceland, and Greenland, before landfall on Newfoundland was finally achieved on June 1 that year. Future stops were planned along the Atlantic Canadian and American coast.

The schedule of the voyage was:

 April 24 – Haugesund, Norway
 May 3 – Reykjavik, Iceland
 May 16 – Quqortoq, Greenland
 June 1 – St. Anthony, Newfoundland and Labrador*
 June 15 – Quebec City, Quebec*
 July 1–3 – Toronto, Ontario*
 July 8 – Fairport Harbor, Ohio, U.S.*
 July 14 – Bay City, Michigan, U.S.*
 July 17-20 – Plymouth Harbor, Massachusetts, U.S. (2018 tour)
 July 22 – Beaver Island. Michigan, U.S.
 July 27 – Chicago, Illinois, U.S.*
 Aug. 5 – Green Bay, Wisconsin, U.S.*
 Aug. 18 – Duluth, Minnesota, U.S.*
 Sept. (TBD) – Oswego, New York Canals, New York, U.S.*
 Sept. 1 – Ilion, New York, U.S.
 Sept. 3 – Little Falls, New York, U.S.
 Sept. 15 – New York City, New York, U.S.*
 Oct. (TBD) – Mystic Seaport, Connecticut, U.S.*

(*Approximate dates)

In mid-July 2016 doubts were raised about the ship's ability to visit United States destinations in the Great Lakes. The United States Coast Guard deemed it a commercial vessel, requiring a pilot per a 1960 law. The total cost of piloting was estimated at $400,000. Sons of Norway raised over $60,000 in order to help pay the pilot fees. On 4 August 2016 Viking Kings issued a press release declaring that Green Bay would be the ship's last stop in the Great Lakes, planning to make its next stop in New York in September.

Awards
The crew of Draken Harald Hårfagre were awarded the Leif Erikson Award by The Exploration Museum at the 2016 Explorers Festival in Húsavík, Iceland. Norwegian ambassador Cecilie Landsverk accepted the award on behalf of the crew from Iceland's President Guðni Th. Jóhannesson, followed by a video message from the captain.

Notes

External links

 
 George Indruszewski and Jon B. Godal, "Maritime skills and astronomic knowledge in the Viking Age Baltic Sea." Studia mythological Slavica 9, 2006. (p 15 – 39)
 Teknisk Ukeblad
 Article from Norwegian Embassy in Moscow website 

2012 ships
Individual sailing vessels
Rowing boats
Ships built in Norway
Viking ship replicas